The Mangela, or Mangala is a subcaste of the Koli caste found in the Indian state of Maharashtra.

The Mangela Kolis mostly work as fishermen for their livelihood.

History 
In the year of 1922, the Mangela Kolis were hit by an epidemic of smallpox. They believed this epidemic to have been caused by a goddess who had therefore to be propitiated. Ceremonies were held at which Mangela Koli women became possessed by the deity. Through these mediums she made it known to the community that she would be satisfied only if they gave up meat, fish, liquor and toddy. The propitiation ceremony of the Mangela Kolis and Vaitty Kolis conformed to this pattern. As their spirit-mediums were normally female, women were possessed by the goddess and made her wishes known. One of these wishes was that they abstain from alcoholic drinks and meat. The Koli women who was possessed buy godess known as Salahbai or advising sister because she gave the advices of godess.

The Mangela Kolis of Gujarat and Maharashtra started Devi movement to rid themselves of bad habits such as the consumption of meat (nonvegetarianism) and liquor.

Clans 
Here are some of the prominent clans of Mangela Kolis,
 Mangela
 Tandel
 Raut
 Hambeere
 Damankar
 Dhanu
 Morde
 Monderkar
 Vaidya

Classification 
The Mangela Kolis are classified as an Other Backward Class (OBC) caste by Government of Maharashtra.

References 

Koli subcastes

External links 
 Undisclosed Facts of Tribal Life By Paramjot Singh Chahel